6-Nonenal is an organic compound with the formula C2H5CH=CH(CH2)4CHO. Other isomeric nonenal compounds are also known to exist naturally, e.g. 2-nonenal. The cis-isomer of 6-nonenal is often listed as the principal component in the aromas of muskmelon fruits. The trans-isomer is listed as an off-flavor aroma of milk foams, and thought to be a possible polypropylene odorant.

Biosynthesis
6-Nonenal is thought to be biosynthesized from γ-lineolenic acid catalyzed by a lipoxygenase. The lipoxygenase converts alkene groups into hydroperoxides, which cleave by hydroperoxide lyase into the corresponding cis-aldehydes. Consistent with this mechanism, the odor of muskmelons requires exposure to air. In the ripe, unmodified muskmelon, cis-6-nonenal exists in only low concentration. A steep increase in the concentration of 6-nonenal is noticed when the cells are lysed and exposed to air. This increase is attributed to rapid formation of hydroperoxides.  Trans,cis-2,6-nonadienal is a related fragrance that arises via a similar pathway.

Laboratory synthesis
Either geometric isomer of this compound may be prepared by preparing by brominating 5-octene-1-ol, then preparing the appropriate Grignard reagent. Triethyl orthoformate is treated with this Grignard reagent, then hydrolyzed to give 6-nonenal.

References

Fatty aldehydes
Alkenals